Xegundo Xou da Xuxa is the third studio album by Brazilian singer, TV host and actress Xuxa Meneghel, released on June 23, 1987 by Som Livre. The album sold more than 2.754 million copies. It is one of the most popular albums of Xuxa's career, surpassing sales in the previous album Xou da Xuxa (1986).

Production 
For this album, Xuxa received about 900 songs from various composers. Of this large amount, between 15 and 20 songs were recorded and 13 were released, not counting with the participation of Patrícia Marx in the disc. The singer even commented that the choice of repertoire was very difficult, since she liked the majority. The disc was recorded in only 20 days.

Feast of the Estica and Puxa, composed by the band Chiclete com Banana, was presented to Xuxa after the singer, Bel Marques then promised to compose a song for the presenter.

Xegundo Xou da Xuxa was produced by Michael Sullivan and Paulo Massadas, with artistic coordination Max Pierre.

Release and reception 
Xegundo Xou da Xuxa and was released on 23 June 1987 by Som Livre, in cassette and LP formats. The album was re-released in CD format for the first time in 1995, in 1996 it was re-released on CD and K7 and in 2006 it was released on CD. In 2013, Som Livre in partnership with Xuxa Productions, launched Xou's collection of Xuxa + Untitled CD Fans Selection, a box with all 7 discs released at the time of the program, and with it a CD with unpublished songs, chosen by fans of the presenter.

The album managed to overcome previous album sales, and brought a certain innovation in the songs and especially in Xuxa voice has improved considerably in terms of the songs from her first album Xou da Xuxa (1986). Xegundo Xou da Xuxa has become one of the ten best selling albums in Brazil and to date it is the sixth with 2,754,000 copies sold, and the third best seller of Xuxa's career, being certified diamond by Associação Brasileira de Produtores de Discos (ABPD).
 
The album yielded four singles: "Festa do Estica e Puxa", "O Circo", "Rexeita da Xuxa" and "Croc Croc". The song "Hey Mickey" is a re-recording of the homonymous success sung in English by Toni Basil; "Parabéns da Xuxa" would have entered this album, but was discarded and ended up being included as unpublished in the Karaokê da Xuxa, being included later in the re-release in CD of 1995.

Promotion
Almost the entire album was performed on Xuxa's Xuxa program, but only a few songs were performed by the blonde, more precisely the single from the album. The singer even promoted the album in the program Os Trapalhões.

In addition to broadcasting on radio and TV, Xuxa toured the album that began on August 27, 1987, in São Paulo and ended in December of the same year.

Track listing

Personnel
Produced: Max Pierre, Michael Sullivan and Paulo Massadas
Artistic Coordination: Marlene Mattos and Xuxa Meneghel
Recording Technician: Jorge 'Gordo' Guimarães (bases and keyboards), Luiz G. D 'Orey
Studio Assistants and Mixing: Cezar Barbosa, Ivan Carvalho, Roberta Rodrigues, * Julio Carneiro, Claudio Oliveira and Sergio Rocha
Mixing: Jorge 'Gordo' Guimarães
Photos: Paulo Rocha
Arrangement: Jorge 'Jorginho' Corrêa
Illustration (insert): Reinaldo Waisman
Edition of tape: Jorge 'Gordo' Guimarães
Costume Designer: Sandra Bandeira
Recorded in the studios: Som Livre (Rio de Janeiro)
Hair: Márcia Elias
Musician: Roberto Fernandes

Certifications and sales

See also 
 List of best-selling albums in Brazil
List of best-selling Latin albums

References

External links 
 Xegundo Xou da Xuxa at Discogs

1987 albums
Xuxa albums
Children's music albums by Brazilian artists
Som Livre albums